Satrup is a village and a former municipality in the district of Schleswig-Flensburg, in Schleswig-Holstein, Germany. It is situated approximately 20 km north of Schleswig, and 15 km southeast of Flensburg. Since 1 March 2013, it is part of the municipality Mittelangeln. Satrup is the seat of the Amt ("collective municipality") Mittelangeln. In early May 1945 Heinrich Himmler, former Reichsführer-SS, stayed in a farm near the village for several days while attempting to avoid capture by the Allies.

References

Former municipalities in Schleswig-Holstein